Jesse Vernon Frasure (born September 18, 1981), also known as DJ Telemitry, is an American music publisher, record producer, songwriter, and DJ.

Biography
A Detroit native, Frasure (DJ Telemitry), now lives in Nashville, Tennessee with his wife Stevie Frasure. Frasure began his music career working at Major Bob Music in Nashville, eventually rising to VP of A&R and also signing a publishing and production deal with the company. In June 2016, Roc Nation Nashville and Warner/Chappell Music launched Rhythm House, a venture led by Frasure, serving as General Manager. Rhythm House includes Frasure's own writing and production activities, as well as the signing and development of other composers and producers.

Growing up, he was surrounded by a family with a passion for music. His father often played in bands full of Motown and classic rock. As a college student at Michigan State University, Frasure first began programming his own music, heavily influenced by his love for electronic dance and the mix of his Motown roots. He then moved to Nashville, finishing his college career at Belmont University, It was there that a passion for even more styles of music grew.

Throughout his career, Frasure has merged his love for all genres of music to diversify his sound. He has produced, co-written, or remixed for artists including Kylie Minogue,
Meghan Trainor, Florida Georgia Line, Fancy, Luke Bryan, Rascal Flatts, Billy Currington, Brett Kissel, Gary Allan, Hot Chelle Rae, Jordin Sparks. In 2015, he reached the No. 1 spot on the Billboard Country charts with his Florida Georgia Line co-write "Sun Daze".

As DJ Telemitry, Frasure has DJed parties for celebrity clients including Nicki Minaj, Lil Wayne, Drake, Kim Zolciak, Todd English, and Cee Lo. He has DJed across the globe for party planners Colin Cowie Lifestyles and Angel City Designs.

Frasure has written 12 number one songs, produced an additional 8 number one songs, and has seen multi-platinum success producing for the likes of Thomas Rhett, Billy Currington, Lauren Alaina among others.

Awards and nominations

Singles

Discography

References

External links
 

Michigan State University alumni
Belmont University alumni
1981 births
Living people